Timbarra River may refer to:

Timbarra River (New South Wales)
Timbarra River (Victoria)